Astrocaryum minus is a species of flowering plant in the family Arecaceae. It is found in Brazil and French Guiana. It is threatened by habitat loss.

References

minus
Flora of Brazil
Palms of French Guiana
Critically endangered flora of South America
Taxonomy articles created by Polbot
Plants described in 1877